Camposano is a comune (municipality) in the Metropolitan City of Naples in the Italian region Campania, located about  northeast of Naples.

Camposano borders the following municipalities: Cicciano, Cimitile, Comiziano, Nola.

References

External links
 www.comune.camposano.na.it/

Cities and towns in Campania